Mud is a liquid or semi-liquid mixture of water and soil.

MUD is a multiplayer real-time virtual world (originally Multi-User Dungeon, Multi-User Dimension, or Multi-User Domain)

Mud or MUD may also refer to:

Construction material
Drilling fluid, commonly called drilling mud
Joint compound, powdered gypsum mixed with water

Film and television
Mud (TV series), a BBC television program
Mud (1997 film), a Bulgarian short film
Mud (2012 film), a coming-of-age drama film directed by Jeff Nichols

Music
Mud (band), British glam rock band
"Mud", a song by Peaches from the album I Feel Cream
"Mud", a single by The Road Hammers from the album Wheels

Places
Metropolitan Utilities District (MUD), Omaha, Nebraska
Mud, West Virginia
Mud village, Spiti, a village in Himachal Pradesh, India
Mud, Iran, a city in South Khorasan Province
Mud District, an administrative subdivision in South Khorasan Province
Mud Rural District, an administrative subdivision in South Khorasan Province
Mud-e Olya, a village in South Khorasan Province, Iran
Mud (river), a river of Baden-Württemberg, Germany
Mud River (disambiguation), several titles
Municipal utility district, a special-purpose district in the United States that provides public utilities.

Other uses
Mark Grant (baseball) (born 1963), nicknamed "Mud", American baseball player and sportscaster
Mesa de la Unidad Democrática, a Venezuelan electoral coalition
Middle-Up-Down, a lead convention in

See also

MUD1, the first virtual world in video gaming
MUD2, the successor to MUD1
MUD Literary Club, originally "Mates of Ubud"
Mudd, a surname
Mudd Jeans, a women's clothing brand